Lokomotiv 2012 Mezdra was a Bulgarian football club from the city of Mezdra.

History

Foundation
The team was founded in 2012 after dissolving of the original club PFC Lokomotiv Mezdra.

Honours
V Group:
 Winners (1): 2013–14
Cup of Bulgarian Amateur Football League:
 Winners (1): 2013

Last squad
As of 16 February 2016

For recent transfers, see Transfers summer 2015 and Transfers winter 2015–16.

Past seasons

Managers

References

External links
bgclubs.eu

Football clubs in Bulgaria
Association football clubs established in 2012
2012 establishments in Bulgaria
2016 disestablishments in Bulgaria
Association football clubs disestablished in 2016
Mezdra
Mezdra OFC

bg:ФК Локомотив 2012 (Мездра)